Bengt Andreas Holmberg (born 22 December 1966 in Lund) is a Swedish prelate who is the current Bishop of Stockholm.

Biography
Holmberg was born in 1966 and partly raised in Tanzania. He was ordained priest in 1993 for the Diocese of Stockholm and since 2012 has worked as a diocesan deputy with responsibility for religious services. He was previously a parish priest in Stockholm and a theological teacher in Tanzania. In 2019 he defended his thesis on "The Church in the new landscape," the theology that emerges in the Swedish church congregations working in multi-cultural and multi-religious environments.

Holmberg was elected bishop on 5 March 2019.
He was consecrated on September 22 in Uppsala Cathedral by Archbishop Antje Jackelén. Holmberg is the son of the priest Bengt Holmberg.

References 

1966 births
Living people
21st-century Lutheran bishops
People from Lund